Louis Auguste Wagner (5 February 1882 – 13 March 1960) was a French Grand Prix driver who won the first ever United States and British Grands Prix. Wagner was also a pioneer aviator.

Early life
Wagner was born in Le Pré-Saint-Gervais, Seine-Saint-Denis.

Motor racing
Wagner began racing cars while in his teens and claimed victory in 1903 driving a Darracq in a voiturette class race at the Circuit des Ardennes at Bastogne, Belgium. Wagner was one of the drivers for the Darracq team in the 1904 Gordon Bennett Cup in Germany that finished 8th and in 1905 at the Circuit d'Auvergne in Clermont-Ferrand, he was eliminated in the first round.

Competing in the United States, Wagner won the Vanderbilt Cup of 1906 driving a Darracq model 120 over a Long Island racecourse. He finished 5th in the 1907 Kaiserpreis in Germany but the following year in Savannah won the first ever United States Grand Prix driving a Fiat.

Driving a Mercedes, Wagner finished second to Christian Lautenschlager in the 1914 French Grand Prix at Lyon.He also served his country during the First World War, fighting in the French Artillery division. He competed in the 1919 Indianapolis 500 driving a Ballot but went out with a broken wheel on lap 45. In 1924 he drove for the Alfa Romeo team, in a P2 alongside Antonio Ascari and Giuseppe Campari. In 1926, Wagner teamed up with Robert Sénéchal to drive a Delage 155B to victory in the first ever British Grand Prix. In August he won the Grand Prix de la Baule, held on a temporary beach course, in a Delage 2LCV. In addition to Grand Prix racing, Wagner also competed in the 1925 24 Hours of Le Mans together with fellow countryman Charles Flohot in a Ariès Type S GP, they finisht 6th overal and 2e in class 3.0. In 1927 Louis Wagner became second overall at the Coppa Florio and won his class +3.0 in a Peugeot.

Aviation
Wagner began flying airplanes in 1910. He worked for the Hanriot company flying their monoplanes.

Later life and death
During World War 2 Wagner was diagnosed with tuberculosis of the bone compelled the amputation of a leg, and Wagner was given the post of instructor and supervisor at the Montlhery circuit but the disease worsened, by the late 1950s he was housebound. In 1955 Louis Wagner was awarded the Legion d'Honneur for distinguished service in the First World War, although it had been delayed 37 years due to criticism of his racing for Mercedes-Benz just before the war. 

Wagner died on March 13, 1960, at the age of 78 in Montlhéry, France.

Indy 500 results

See also
List of pilots awarded an Aviator's Certificate by the Aéro-Club de France in 1910
René Thomas

References

External links
Louis Wagner wins the 1906 Vanderbilt Cup Race (VanderbiltCupRaces.com)

1882 births
1960 deaths
Grand Prix drivers
Brooklands people
Indianapolis 500 drivers
French racing drivers
24 Hours of Le Mans drivers
Sportspeople from Seine-Saint-Denis